Éliane is a French feminine given name.

People with the given name include:
 Éliane Amado Levy-Valensi (1919-2006), French-Israeli psychologist
 Éliane Assassi, (1958), member of the Senate of France
 Eliane Becks Nininahazwe, Burundian musician and HIV/AIDS activist
 Eliane Chappuis (1978), American actress of Swiss-French and Vietnamese descent
 Éliane Droubry (1987), Côte d'Ivoirian swimmer
 Éliane Duthoit (1946), French United Nations official
 Eliane Elias (1960), Brazilian jazz pianist and singer
 Éliane Gubin (1942), Belgian historian, researcher and professor
 Éliane Jacq (1948–2011), French athlete
 Éliane Jeannin-Garreau (1911-1999), French resistance agent
 Eliane Karp (1953), French-born wife of Peru's former president, anthropologist
 Éliane Amado Levy-Valensi (1919–2006), French-Israeli psychologist
 Éliane de Meuse (1899-1993), Belgian painter
 Eliane Plewman,(born Éliane Browne-Bartroli) (1917-1944), French SOE agent
 Éliane Radigue (1932), French electronic music composer
 Éliane Reyes (1977), Belgian pianist

Surname
Pierre Éliane

French feminine given names